Six ships of the Royal Navy have been named HMS Rodney, of which at least the last five were named after the Georgian Admiral George, Lord Rodney. A seventh was planned but never completed:
  was a 4-gun cutter in use in 1759.
  was a 16-gun vessel, possibly a brig-sloop, purchased in 1780, probably in the Caribbean, and in service in 1781. The French Rohan-Soubise captured her in 1782 at Demerara. In June 1783 she sailed for St. Pierre and Miquelon. She was struck from the lists at Rochefort in December, and from the Navy lists in 1784.
  was a 74-gun third rate launched in 1809, razeed to 50 guns and renamed Greenwich in 1827, and sold in 1836.
  was a 90-gun second rate launched in 1833, converted to screw propulsion and rearmed with 70 guns in 1860, and broken up in 1884.
  was an  launched in 1884 and sold in 1909.
She was ordered in April 1916, but construction was suspended in March 1917 and cancelled in October 1918.
  was a  launched in 1925 and broken up in 1948.

Battle honours
 Quebec 1759
 Syria 1840
 Crimea 1854–55
 Norway 1940
 Atlantic 1940–41
 Bismarck 1941
 Malta Convoys 1941–42
 North Africa 1942–43
 Sicily 1943
 Salerno 1943
 Mediterranean 1943
 English Channel 1944
 Normandy 1944
 Arctic 1944

Citations

References
 
 Demerliac, Alain (1996) La Marine De Louis XVI: Nomenclature Des Navires Français De 1774 À 1792. (Nice: Éditions OMEGA). 

Royal Navy ship names